Kokkayar is a village in Azhutha block of Peerumedu taluk in Idukki district, Kerala, India. It is surrounded by Koottikkal, Elappara panchayaths in north, Peerumedu and Elappara panchayaths in east, Peruvanthanam in south and Koottikkal, Mundakkayam panchayaths in west.

Administration
The panchayath of Kokkayar is divided into 13 wards for administrative convenience.

Wards
 Mukkulam
 Vadakke mala
 Meloram
 Mulamkunnu
 Kodikuthy
 Boyce
 Kokkayar
 Poovanchi
 Narakampuzha
 Kutti plangadu
 Vembly
 Kanaka puram
 Yendayar east

Demographics
 India census, Kokkayar had a population of 3057 households.

References

Villages in Idukki district

ml:കൊക്കയാർ ഗ്രാമപഞ്ചായത്ത്